The Australian cricket team played 31 first-class matches in England in 1893, including 3 Tests. One of the first-class matches was against the Oxford and Cambridge Universities Past and Present team in Portsmouth. In their first innings, the Australians scored 843 runs, with eight of their batsmen scoring half-centuries. This is the only instance in first-class cricket with eight half-centuries being scored in the same innings.

Test series summary
England won the Test series 1–0 with two matches drawn.

First Test

Second Test

Third Test

Ceylon
As on previous voyages to England, the Australians had a stopover in Colombo and played a match on 5 April against a Ceylon team, which was drawn.

References

External links
 CricketArchive – tour summaries

Annual reviews
 James Lillywhite's Cricketers' Annual (Red Lilly) 1894
 Wisden Cricketers' Almanack 1894

Further reading
 Bill Frindall, The Wisden Book of Test Cricket 1877-1978, Wisden, 1979
 Chris Harte, A History of Australian Cricket, Andre Deutsch, 1993
 Ray Robinson, On Top Down Under, Cassell, 1975

1893 in Australian cricket
1893 in English cricket
1893 in Ceylon
International cricket competitions from 1888–89 to 1918
1893
1893
English cricket seasons in the 19th century
Sri Lankan cricket seasons from 1880–81 to 1971–72
1893